Drosera may refer to:

 The plant genus Drosera
 Opensource orienteering management system Drosera (orienteering)
 Drosera (naiad), a nymph from Greek mythology.